W. Robert Grady (born April 30, 1950) was a  Republican member of the United States  North Carolina General Assembly representing the state's fifteenth House district, including constituents in Onslow county.  A businessman from Jacksonville, North Carolina, Grady served twelve two-year terms, the last one of which was the 2009-2010 session. He did not stand for election in 2010.

Early life and education

Robert Grady was born in 1950, and grew up in Jacksonville, the eldest of three brothers. His mother’s family – the Hursts – had lived in Onslow County on a farm that is now part of Camp Lejeune for generations; his father, after serving in World War II moved to Onslow County to work at Camp Davis (near Holly Ridge) and, later, Camp Lejeune.

Robert attended public schools, graduating from Jacksonville High School, then attending the University of North Carolina at Chapel Hill. He graduated with a BA degree in history and, later, received a second degree in history (with honors) from Campbell University.

Political career 

Robert was elected to the Jacksonville City Council in 1981, serving three terms, including two as Mayor Pro Tem. He was elected to the North Carolina House of Representatives in 1986, becoming one of the first Republicans elected to the legislature from Eastern North Carolina. While serving in the House he specialized in Education and the Judiciary, serving on the appropriations committee for Crime Control and Public Safety, which oversees the judiciary, clerks of court offices, prisons, and state law enforcement (the highway patrol, alcohol law enforcement, the SBI and prisons).

He has also served on the appropriations committee for Education which funds the public schools, community colleges and universities, as well as providing state funding for private colleges (Legislative Tuition Grant) and charter schools.

He sponsored legislation to teach university level courses at community colleges and to insure that the academic credits students earn at community colleges will transfer to universities if a student decides to continue his or her education.

As a result of his efforts Coastal Carolina Community College and UNC-Wilmington established one of the first programs that allows students to receive a 4-year degree from UNC-W – without ever leaving Onslow County. Both programs were praised as examples of reducing costs, providing more convenient services and saving taxpayers money.

In the House, Grady also sponsored legislation to establish the Veteran’s Cemetery in Jacksonville and fought, over three sessions, to pass legislation to force the state to refund taxes the government had improperly collected from retired veterans and federal employees. (The state tried to use a technicality to try to keep the retirees’ money).

A popular legislator, Grady was elected and reelected 12 times by large margins. In January, he announced he would not seek reelection and, instead, would run for Onslow County Clerk of Court.

Personal life

Robert Grady has been married to his wife, Neta Lucas Grady, for 36 years.

Official Website 

www.robertgrady.com

References

External links

|-

|-

Members of the North Carolina House of Representatives
Living people
1950 births
21st-century American politicians